Bellamya phthinotropis is a species of large freshwater snail with a gill and an operculum, an aquatic gastropod mollusc in the family Viviparidae.

This species is found in Kenya, Tanzania, and Uganda. It was first described by Eduard von Martens in 1892.

References

Viviparidae
Taxa named by Eduard von Martens
Gastropods described in 1892
Taxonomy articles created by Polbot